Alioune Diop (10 January 1910 – 2 May 1980) was a Senegalese writer and editor, founder of the intellectual journal Présence africaine, and a central figure in the Négritude movement.

Early life

Born a Muslim in Saint-Louis, Senegal, French West Africa, Diop attended a koranic school but his aunts also taught him to read the Bible. As an adult, Alioune Diop will convert to Christianity and will receive his Catholic baptism from Dominican Father Jean-Augustin Maydieu on Christmas night of 1944 in Saint-Flour in Cantal (France) under the name of Jean. After receiving his secondary education at the Lycée Faidherbe in Saint-Louis, Senegal, he continued his studies in Algeria and at the Sorbonne in Paris, where he went in 1937. He took a position as professor of classical literature in Paris and after World War II represented Senegal in the French senate, to which he was elected in 1946.

Career
In 1947, he founded in Paris the influential journal Présence africaine, to promoting African cultural identity and the liberation of peoples of Africa and the African diaspora. This was followed by the establishment of Présence africaine Editions, which became a leading publishing house for African authors.

Aside from his publishing initiatives, he was a key figure in many anti-colonial and African cultural interventions. He founded the Société Africaine de Culture in 1956 and that same year was principal organizer of the first international Congress of Black Writers and Artists, held in Paris, which attracted artists and writers from across the world, including Pablo Picasso and Claude Lévi-Strauss. In 1966, together with Léopold Sédar Senghor he organized the first World Festival of Negro Arts in Dakar (1er Festival mondial des Arts nègres, also called FESMAN); among its many participants were Josephine Baker, Aimé Césaire, Duke Ellington, Langston Hughes and André Malraux).

Diop had an important role in Second Vatican Council as an African Roman Catholic and was a friend of popes John XXIII and Paul VI.

On the occasion of the preparation of the Second Vatican Council, Alioune Diop will mobilize, within the Société africaine de culture, Catholic intellectuals, priests and laity, for the meeting in Rome which took place from 26 to 27 May 1962, on the theme "African personality and Catholicism".

After the declaration of Paul VI in Kampala ("You can and must have an African Christianity"), the SAC will give Alioune Diop (together with the Cameroonian layman Georges Ngango) the mission of obtaining from the pope the authorization to organize "the general states of African Christianity".

Death
Diop died in Paris aged 70 on 2 May 1980. His funeral took place in the Saint-Médard church in Paris at the same day and he was buried in the Catholic cemetery of Bel-Air (in Dakar).

Legacy
A literary prize in his honour, the Prix International Alioune Diop, was established in 1982.

References

External links
  French Senate website.
 Oxford African American Studies Center.

Senegalese politicians
Senegalese Roman Catholics
French Senators of the Fourth Republic
1910 births
1980 deaths
Senators of French West Africa
Converts to Roman Catholicism from Islam
Magazine founders